Moose Lake Township is a township in Beltrami County, Minnesota, United States. The population was 205 as of the 2000 census.

Geography
According to the United States Census Bureau, the township has a total area of 36.2 square miles (93.6 km), of which 30.9 square miles (79.9 km) is land and 5.3 square miles (13.7 km) (14.63%) is water.

Lakes
 Big Rice Lake (east quarter)
 Kitchi Lake (northeast half)
 Little Moose Lake
 Little Pimushe Lake
 Little Rice Lake
 Moose Lake
 Pimushe Lake (east three-quarters)
 Popple Lake
 Rice Lake

Adjacent townships
 Birch Township (north)
 Third River Township, Itasca County (northeast)
 Ten Lake Township (southwest)
 Sugar Bush Township (west)
 Taylor Township (northwest)

Demographics
As of the census of 2000, there were 205 people, 75 households, and 54 families residing in the township.  The population density was 6.6 people per square mile (2.6/km).  There were 154 housing units at an average density of 5.0/sq mi (1.9/km).  The racial makeup of the township was 96.59% White and 3.41% Native American.

There were 75 households, out of which 33.3% had children under the age of 18 living with them, 65.3% were married couples living together, 4.0% had a female householder with no husband present, and 26.7% were non-families. 20.0% of all households were made up of individuals, and 6.7% had someone living alone who was 65 years of age or older.  The average household size was 2.73 and the average family size was 3.22.

In the township the population was spread out, with 28.8% under the age of 18, 4.4% from 18 to 24, 25.4% from 25 to 44, 26.8% from 45 to 64, and 14.6% who were 65 years of age or older.  The median age was 41 years. For every 100 females, there were 122.8 males.  For every 100 females age 18 and over, there were 121.2 males.

The median income for a household in the township was $24,271, and the median income for a family was $25,417. Males had a median income of $35,625 versus $20,000 for females. The per capita income for the township was $13,527.  About 9.4% of families and 20.8% of the population were below the poverty line, including 29.5% of those under the age of eighteen and 15.4% of those 65 or over.

References
 United States National Atlas
 United States Census Bureau 2007 TIGER/Line Shapefiles
 United States Board on Geographic Names (GNIS)

Townships in Beltrami County, Minnesota
Townships in Minnesota